This is a list of hospitals in St. Louis, including those in St. Louis County, sorted by name.  A list of hospitals in Missouri is also available.

Hospital Systems present in Greater St. Louis

BJC HealthCare
HSHS
Mercy
OSF HealthCare
SSM Health

Hospitals in Greater St. Louis

Alvin J. Siteman Cancer Center - St. Louis
Barnes-Jewish Hospital - St. Louis, Missouri
Barnes-Jewish West County Hospital - Creve Coeur, Missouri
Christian Hospital - St. Louis
St. Luke's Des Peres Hospital - Des Peres, Missouri
Kindred Hospital - St. Louis - St. Louis
Mercy Hospital St. Louis - Creve Coeur, Missouri
Mercy Hospital South -  Unincorporated South St. Louis County, Missouri (Tesson Ferry Township)
Mercy Rehabilitation Hospital - Chesterfield, Missouri
Metropolitan Saint Louis Psychiatric Center - St. Louis
Missouri Baptist Medical Center - Town and Country, Missouri
Ranken Jordan Pediatric Specialty Hospital - Maryland Heights, Missouri
The Rehabilitation Institute of St. Louis - St. Louis
St. Louis Behavioral Medicine Institute - St. Louis
St. Louis Children's Hospital - St. Louis, Missouri
Saint Louis University Hospital - St. Louis
St. Louis VA Medical Center - St. Louis
St. Luke's Hospital - Chesterfield, Missouri
Select Specialty Hospital - St. Louis
Shriners Hospitals for Children - St. Louis
SSM Health Cardinal Glennon Children's Hospital - St. Louis, Missouri
SSM Health DePaul Hospital - Bridgeton, Missouri
SSM Health St. Clare Hospital - Unincorporated South St. Louis County, Missouri (Queeny Township)
SSM Health St. Mary's Hospital - Richmond Heights, Missouri

University Medical Centers in Greater St. Louis

Saint Louis University Medical Center - St. Louis
Washington University Medical Center - St. Louis

External links
Missouri hospitals

Hospitals
St. Louis-related lists
Missouri, St. Louis
St. Louis